Pinsent Masons LLP is a multinational law firm which specialises in the energy, infrastructure, financial services, real estate and technology, science & industry sectors. The firm ranks among the top hundred law firms in the world by turnover.

Pinsent Masons LLP has over 450 partners, a total legal team of around 1,900 people and more than 3,700 employees. More than 500 of the firm's staff are based in its international headquarters in the City of London. It has more PLC clients than any law firm except one.

Pinsent Masons was named 'Law Firm of the Year' in 2021 and 2016 by respected industry magazine Legal Business, 'Law Firm of the Year 2018' at The Lawyer Awards and 'Law Firm of the Year' 2016 at Law.com's British Legal Awards. In 2020 and 2015 it was named 'The Most Innovative Law Firm in Europe' by the Financial Times.

The firm has 26 offices across Africa, Asia Pacific, Europe and the Middle East. In 2017, Pinsent Masons entered into an association with Saudi-based law firm AlSabhan & Alajaji.

History

Pinsent Masons has roots dating back to 1769. The modern day firm is the product of a series of mergers between firms including Pinsent & Co, Masons, Simpson Curtis, Biddle & Co, L'Estrange & Brett and McGrigors. Alumni of the legacy firms include former British Chancellor Alistair Darling.

The firm's recent history has been dominated by a process of internationalisation. Over the past decade it has developed a presence in key major cities around the world: Beijing (2007), Singapore (2009), Paris (2012), Munich (2012), Brussels (2015), Sydney (2015), Melbourne (2015), Düsseldorf (2016), Johannesburg (2016), Madrid (2017), Dublin (2017), Perth (2017) and Frankfurt (2019).

The firm's board is led by Senior Partner Andrew Masraf and Managing Partner John Cleland. In 2016 the firm announced the appointment of former Secretary of State for International Development Douglas Alexander as a strategic adviser, and appointed its first external board member in the form of former banker Pauline Egan.

Strategy 
Unlike many firms of its size, the firm professes to specialise in only five global sectors: financial services, technology, science & insdutry, energy, real estate and infrastructure.

Innovation 
Pinsent Masons has won awards for innovation. In 2013 it was in the vanguard of firms to launch a contract lawyer service, called Vario. It also secured mandates to act as 'sole adviser' to corporates including Balfour Beatty and E.ON. In 2015 the firm acquired the majority stake in Cerico, an online compliance business.

Diversity 
Pinsent Masons is the highest ranked professional services firm in the Stonewall Workplace Equality Index. It is also ranked among The Times Top 50 Workplaces for Women 2016. David Isaac, a partner of the firm, was appointed as Chair of the UK Equality and Human Rights Commission in 2016.

References

Patent law firms
Intellectual property law firms
Law firms based in London
Law firms established in 1850
Foreign law firms with offices in Hong Kong
1850 establishments in England